Constitutional Assembly elections were held in Bulgaria on 10 June 1990, with a second round for eighteen seats on 17 June. They were the first elections held since the fall of Communism the previous winter, and the first free national elections since 1931. The elections were held to elect the 7th Grand National Assembly, tasked with adopting a new (democratic) constitution. The new electoral system was changed from 400 single-member constituencies used during the Communist era to a split system whereby half were elected in single member constituencies and half by proportional representation. The result was a victory for the Bulgarian Socialist Party, the freshly renamed Communist Party, which won 211 of the 400 seats.

The Grand National Assembly drafted the country's fourth constitution, which was promulgated on 12 July 1991. The first elections under the new document were held three months later.

Results

References

Bulgaria
Constitutional
Elections in Bulgaria
June 1990 events in Europe